SKS365 Group is an authorized sports betting and gaming operator, one of the top five in Italian market. It was founded in 2009 in Innsbruck, Austria. SKS365 offers an immersive and multichannel gaming experience both online and offline, through a retail network of almost 1000 betting shops. 
Planetwin365, the SKS365 flagship brand, is a leading sportsbook in Italy, providing a level of entertainment that is driven by an appetite for innovation to over 500.000 registered customers, with over 1,000 types of wagers, 8,000 pre-match events per week, plus live betting odds on over 1,200 live events over the weekend. The SKS365 Group has offices in Italy, Malta, Austria and Serbia, and employs close to 500 people.

Partners
Starting from July 2018, the entry of the advertising and sponsorship ban has deprived the gaming sector of the opportunity to make agreement and partnership with sports - and not - organizations.
SKS365 has been an Institutional Partner of SSC Napoli for season 2018/19, and held visibility agreements on the fields of SS Lazio, Fiorentina, Genoa, Sampdoria, Cagliari, Parma, Chievo, Empoli, Udinese, Salernitana, Lecce and has been Title Sponsor of the Italian Futsal Division.

Recognitions
2021 - EGR ITALY AWARDS - Casino Operator
2019 - EGR ITALY AWARDS - Best Marketing Campaign, with the claim "Il nostro gioco è di un altro pianeta" (our game is from another planet).
2018 - ITQF QUALITY SEAL - Most Qualified Customer Service.

See also

References

General References
FIFA EWS Early Warning System GmbH

External links
Official website

Online poker companies
Gambling companies of Italy
Online gambling companies of Austria
Bookmakers